Younts Peak is a peak in the Absaroka Range in northwestern Wyoming in the United States and the highest point in the Teton Wilderness. The Yellowstone River is formed near the peak from two streams that rise on the northern and southern ridges of the peak and join at the base of the western ridge.  The peak summit itself can be hiked, but accessing the peak is difficult due to its remoteness.  

The peak was named after Harry Yount, a hunter and guide considered to be the first ranger in Yellowstone National Park.

Notes 

Mountains of Wyoming
Mountains of Park County, Wyoming